An emergency notification app is a software application designed to broadcast emergency notifications to one or multiple groups of contacts via various delivery methods. It is built to run on mobile devices such as smartphones and tablet computers. An emergency notification app may be part of a wider emergency notification system or it may be provided as an alternative to such a system.

Emergency Service Response App 

An Emergency Services Response App is designed to take in emergency incidents from Public Safety Answering Points via e-mail, fax, or direct communication means and then transmit this information to first responders. This includes direct through app, text message, or even by e-mail. The app allows responders to respond into the system that they are responding to the incident allowing incident response and management information to be exchanged amongst the system. Additional features with the platform include mapping, pre-planing, and other resource references among all responders. 

See also 
 Emergency Alert System
 Emergency Communication System
 Emergency notification system
 Wireless Emergency Alerts

References 

 
 

Emergency communication
Emergency management software
Warning systems